is a railway station on the privately operated Chōshi Electric Railway Line in Chōshi, Chiba, Japan. The station is the easternmost station in the Kanto region, and a plaque erected in February 2012 stands on the station platform indicating this.

Lines

Station layout
The station is unstaffed, and consists of a side platform serving a single track.

History
The railway closed in November 1917, but was reopened on 5 July 1923 as the Chōshi Railway. It was so named (literally "sea lion island") because of the large numbers of sea lions seen on the coast up until the 1950s. The present-day station structure was built in 1951.

Ashikajima became an unstaffed station from 1 January 2008.

Passenger statistics
In fiscal 2010, the station was used by an average of 147 passengers daily (boarding passengers only). Passenger figures for previous years are as shown below.

Surrounding area
 Ashikajima beach

See also
 List of railway stations in Japan

References

External links

 Choshi Electric Railway station information 

Stations of Chōshi Electric Railway Line
Railway stations in Chiba Prefecture
Railway stations in Japan opened in 1913